Potomac High School is a public high school located in the Glassmanor census-designated place in unincorporated Prince George's County, Maryland, United States, with an Oxon Hill postal address. It is a part of Prince George's County Public Schools.

The principal is Nathaniel R. Laney. The approximate enrollment as of August 2010 stands at 1,216 students in grades nine through twelve. The school hours are from 7:45am to 2:25pm. Potomac operates on an alternating A/B-Day block schedule. There is a mandatory uniform policy at this school. Potomac features a school-wide America's Choice School Design signature program as well as an expansive "smaller learning communities" program, that essentially breaks the school down into smaller schools or "career academies".

The school serves: all of Glassmanor CDP, the Town of Forest Heights, most of Hillcrest Heights CDP, a portion of Marlow Heights CDP, and a portion of Silver Hill CDP.

Smaller learning communities
School of Arts, Media, and Communications
Academy of the Arts - Dance
Academy of the Arts - Music
Academy of the Arts - Visual
School of Business Management and Finance
Academy of Finance
Academy of Business Management
School of Consumer Services, Hospitality and Tourism
Academy of Hospitality and Restaurant Management
School of Human Resource Services
Academy of Military Sciences
Teacher Academy of Maryland
School of Manufacturing, Engineering and Technology

Notable alumni
 Dante Cunningham
 Ronald Darby
 Tavon Young
 Monty Williams
 Kevin Hooks

References

https://wamu.org/story/19/06/18/monica-goldson-is-prince-georges-county-public-schools-new-ceo/

Public high schools in Maryland
Schools in Prince George's County, Maryland
Oxon Hill, Maryland